Events from the year 1763 in Austria

Incumbents
 Monarch – Maria Theresa

Events

 February 15 – The Seven Years' War between Austria and Prussia and their allies is ended by the Treaty of Hubertusburg.

Births

Deaths

References

 
Years of the 18th century in Austria